The second season of the Dragon Ball Z anime series contains the Namek and Captain Ginyu arcs, which comprises Part 1 of the Frieza Saga. The episodes are produced by Toei Animation, and are based on the final 26 volumes of the Dragon Ball manga series by Akira Toriyama. 

The 35-episode season originally ran from March 1990 until January 1991 in Japan on Fuji Television. The first English airing of the season was primarily on Fox, UPN and WB affiliate stations in the United States and Canada, where it ran from September 1997 until May 1998, when the show was withdrawn from first-run syndication. On August 31, 1998 the first previously syndicated and heavily edited 53 (originally 67) episodes began airing on Cartoon Network's weekday-afternoon programming block, Toonami. The English dub of this season originally featured the third Dragon Ball Z film The Tree of Might as a three-part episode (it was dubbed and aired as if it were a part of the Television series). The episodes aired in a heavily edited, dubbed format released by Funimation Entertainment in association with  Geneon (then known as Pioneer), Saban Entertainment and the Canadian dubbing studio Ocean Productions. This partnership ended after the first 67 episodes of the series, with Funimation doing their own in-house dub for the remainder of the series, after deciding to continue the English Dub of Dragon Ball Z after it became a ratings success on Toonami. Funimation dubbed the series starting at episode 67, using non-union Texas based voice actors, adding a new musical score, and doing less edits to the series content. Their dubs of the remainder of the second season aired in September 1999 on Toonami. In August 2003, Geneon lost its home video distribution license for the first 67 episodes of the series, and it was relicensed by Funimation. The company redubbed these episodes, restoring the removed content and redoing the voice cast. The new dub aired on Cartoon Network in 2005, "replacing" the original Ocean dubbed episodes.

Two pieces of theme music were used throughout the season. The opening theme, "Cha-La Head-Cha-La", is performed by Hironobu Kageyama and the ending theme,  is performed by Manna. The theme for the original 1997 English dub is "Rock the Dragon", performed by Jeremy Sweet. The uncut English redub from 2005 uses "Dragon Ball Z Uncut
theme" by Dave Moran that was then replaced with the "Dragon Ball Z Movie theme" by Mark Menza for the remaster release of season 2.

Funimation released the season in a box set on May 22, 2007, and in June 2009, announced that they would be re-releasing Dragon Ball Z in a new seven volume set called the "Dragon Boxes". Based on the original series masters with frame-by-frame restoration, the first set was released November 10, 2009.


Episode list

References

1990 Japanese television seasons
1991 Japanese television seasons
1997 American television seasons
1998 American television seasons
Z (season 2)